Black Horse Butte is a summit in South Dakota, in the United States.

Black Horse Butte's name comes from the Sioux Indians of the area, who frequently saw a wild black horse near the mountain.

References

Landforms of Corson County, South Dakota
Mountains of South Dakota